Donnelly Airport  is serving, and located  south of, Donnelly, Alberta, Canada.

References

External links
Page about this airport on COPA's Places to Fly airport directory

Registered aerodromes in Alberta
Municipal District of Smoky River No. 130